The ARR Craib Cup was an invitational football tournament held at Firhill, Glasgow, sponsored by and named after a local transport company headquartered in Aberdeen. The only edition took place between 21 and 22 July 2012. It was contested by four teams from the United Kingdom, including three from the host nation Scotland.

Tournament 
Source:

Bracket

Results

Scorers 

3 Goals
Sean Welsh (Partick)

1 Goal
 Callum McGregor (Celtic)
 Conor McAleny (Everton)
 Glen Eadie (Celtic)
 Luke Garbutt (Everton)

1 Goal (cont)
 Patrik Twardzik (Celtic)
 Paul Di Giacomo (Airdrie)
 Ross Barkley (Everton)
 Steven Lawless (Partick)
 Stuart Bannigan (Partick)
 Tony Watt (Celtic)

References

External links 

Defunct international club association football competitions in Europe
International sports competitions in Glasgow
Scottish football friendly trophies
Defunct football cup competitions in Scotland
2012–13 in Scottish football
Partick Thistle F.C.